Hobie Verhulst (born 2 April 1993) is a Dutch professional footballer who plays as a goalkeeper for Eredivisie club AZ Alkmaar. He formerly played for MVV Maastricht, FC Volendam, and Go Ahead Eagles.

Club career
Verhulst made his Eerste Divisie debut for MVV Maastricht on 6 February 2015 in a game against Sparta Rotterdam.

References

External links
 Career stats - Voetbal International
 

1993 births
Living people
Dutch footballers
Footballers from Amsterdam
Association football goalkeepers
Netherlands youth international footballers
Eredivisie players
Eerste Divisie players
AZ Alkmaar players
MVV Maastricht players
FC Volendam players
Go Ahead Eagles players